The Gaussian network model (GNM) is a representation of a biological macromolecule as an elastic mass-and-spring network to study, understand, and characterize the mechanical aspects of its long-time large-scale dynamics.  The model has a wide range of applications from small proteins such as enzymes composed of a single domain, to large macromolecular assemblies such as a ribosome or a viral capsid.  Protein domain dynamics plays key roles in a multitude of molecular recognition and cell signalling processes.
Protein domains, connected by intrinsically disordered flexible linker domains, induce long-range allostery via protein domain dynamics.
The resultant dynamic modes cannot be generally predicted from static structures of either the entire protein or individual domains.

The Gaussian network model is a minimalist, coarse-grained approach to study biological molecules.  In the model, proteins are represented by nodes corresponding to α-carbons of the amino acid residues.  Similarly, DNA and RNA structures are represented with one to three nodes for each nucleotide.  The model uses the harmonic approximation to model interactions. This coarse-grained representation makes the calculations computationally inexpensive.

At the molecular level, many biological phenomena, such as catalytic activity of an enzyme, occur within the range of nano- to millisecond timescales.  All atom simulation techniques, such as molecular dynamics simulations, rarely reach microsecond trajectory length, depending on the size of the system and accessible computational resources.   Normal mode analysis in the context of GNM, or elastic network (EN) models in general, provides insights on the longer-scale functional dynamic behaviors of macromolecules.  Here, the model captures native state functional motions of a biomolecule at the cost of atomic detail. The inference obtained from this model is complementary to atomic detail simulation techniques.

Another model for protein dynamics based on elastic mass-and-spring networks is the Anisotropic Network Model.

Gaussian network model theory 

The Gaussian network model was proposed by Bahar, Atilgan, Haliloglu and Erman in 1997. The GNM is often analyzed using normal mode analysis, which offers an analytical formulation and unique solution for each structure. The GNM normal mode analysis differs from other normal mode analyses in that it is exclusively based on inter-residue contact topology, influenced by the theory of elasticity of Flory  and the Rouse model and does not take the three-dimensional directionality of motions into account.

Representation of structure as an elastic network 
Figure 2 shows a schematic view of elastic network studied in GNM.  Metal beads represent the nodes in this Gaussian network (residues of a protein) and springs represent the connections between the nodes (covalent and non-covalent interactions between residues).  For nodes i and j, equilibrium position vectors, R0i and R0j, equilibrium distance vector, R0ij, instantaneous fluctuation vectors, ΔRi and ΔRj, and instantaneous distance vector, Rij, are shown in Figure 2.  Instantaneous position vectors of these nodes are defined by Ri and Rj. The difference between equilibrium position vector and instantaneous position vector of residue i gives the instantaneous fluctuation vector, ΔRi = Ri - R0i. Hence, the instantaneous fluctuation vector between nodes i and j is expressed as ΔRij = ΔRj - ΔRi = Rij - R0ij.

Potential of the Gaussian network 
The potential energy of the network in terms of ΔRi is

where γ is a force constant uniform for all springs and  Γij is the ijth element of the Kirchhoff (or connectivity) matrix of inter-residue contacts, Γ, defined by

rc is a cutoff distance for spatial interactions and taken to be 7 Å for amino acid pairs (represented by their α-carbons).

Expressing the X, Y and Z components of the fluctuation vectors ΔRi as ΔXT = [ΔX1 ΔX2 ..... ΔXN], ΔYT = [ΔY1 ΔY2 ..... ΔYN], and ΔZT = [ΔZ1 ΔZ2 ..... ΔZN], above equation simplifies to

Statistical mechanics foundations 
In the GNM, the probability distribution of all fluctuations, P(ΔR) is isotropic

and Gaussian

where kB is the Boltzmann constant and T is the absolute temperature.  p(ΔY) and p(ΔZ) are expressed similarly.  
N-dimensional Gaussian probability density function with random variable vector x, mean vector μ and covariance matrix Σ is

 normalizes the distribution and |Σ| is the determinant of the covariance matrix.

Similar to Gaussian distribution, normalized distribution for ΔXT = [ΔX1 ΔX2 ..... ΔXN] around the equilibrium positions can be expressed as

The normalization constant, also the partition function ZX, is given by

where  is the covariance matrix in this case.  ZY and ZZ are expressed similarly.  This formulation requires inversion of the Kirchhoff matrix.  In the GNM, the determinant of the Kirchhoff matrix is zero, hence calculation of its inverse requires eigenvalue decomposition. Γ−1 is constructed using the N-1 non-zero eigenvalues and associated eigenvectors.  Expressions for p(ΔY) and p(ΔZ) are similar to that of p(ΔX). The probability distribution of all fluctuations in GNM becomes

For this mass and spring system, the normalization constant in the preceding expression is the overall GNM partition function, ZGNM,

Expectation values of fluctuations and correlations 
The expectation values of residue fluctuations, <ΔRi2> (also called mean-square fluctuations, MSFs), and their cross-correlations, <ΔRi · ΔRj> can be organized as the diagonal and off-diagonal terms, respectively, of a covariance matrix.  Based on statistical mechanics, the covariance matrix for ΔX is given by

The last equality is obtained by inserting the above  p(ΔX) and taking the (generalized Gaussian) integral. Since,

<ΔRi2> and <ΔRi · ΔRj> follows

Mode decomposition 
The GNM normal modes are found by diagonalization of the Kirchhoff matrix, Γ = UΛUT. Here, U is a unitary matrix, UT = U−1, of the eigenvectors ui of Γ and Λ is the diagonal matrix of eigenvalues λi. The frequency and shape of a mode is represented by its eigenvalue and eigenvector, respectively.  Since the Kirchhoff matrix is positive semi-definite, the first eigenvalue, λ1, is zero and the corresponding eigenvector have all its elements equal to 1/. This shows that the network model translationally invariant.

Cross-correlations between residue fluctuations can be written as a sum over the N-1 nonzero modes as

It follows that, [ΔRi · ΔRj], the contribution of an individual mode is expressed as

where [uk]i is the ith element of uk.

Influence of local packing density 
By definition, a diagonal element of the Kirchhoff matrix, Γii, is equal to the degree of a node in GNM that represents the corresponding residue’s coordination number.  This number is a measure of the local packing density around a given residue.  The influence of local packing density can be assessed by series expansion of Γ−1 matrix. Γ can be written as a sum of two matrices, Γ = D + O, containing diagonal elements and off-diagonal elements of Γ.

Γ−1 = (D + O)−1 = [ D (I + D−1O) ]−1 = (I + D−1O)−1D−1 = (I - D−1O + ...)−1D−1 = D−1 - D−1O D−1 + ...

This expression shows that local packing density makes a significant contribution to expected fluctuations of residues.  The terms that follow inverse of the diagonal matrix, are contributions of positional correlations to expected fluctuations.

GNM applications

Equilibrium fluctuations 
Equilibrium fluctuations of biological molecules can be experimentally measured.  In X-ray crystallography the B-factor (also called Debye-Waller or temperature factor) of each atom is a measure of its mean-square fluctuation near its equilibrium position in the native structure. In NMR experiments, this measure can be obtained by calculating root-mean-square differences between different models.
In many applications and publications, including the original articles, it has been shown that expected residue fluctuations obtained by the GNM are in good agreement with the experimentally measured native state fluctuations.  The relation between B-factors, for example, and expected residue fluctuations obtained from GNM is as follows

Figure 3 shows an example of GNM calculation for the catalytic domain of the protein Cdc25B, a cell division cycle dual-specificity phosphatase.

Physical meanings of slow and fast modes 
Diagonalization of the Kirchhoff matrix decomposes the conformational motions into a spectrum of collective modes. The expected values of fluctuations and cross-correlations are obtained from linear combinations of fluctuations along these normal modes.  The contribution of each mode is scaled with the inverse of that modes frequency. Hence, slow (low frequency) modes contribute most to the expected fluctuations. Along the few slowest modes, motions are shown to be collective and global and potentially relevant to functionality of the biomolecules. Fast (high frequency) modes, on the other hand, describe uncorrelated motions not inducing notable changes in the structure. GNM-based methods do not provide real dynamics but only an approximation based on the combination and interpolation of normal modes. Their applicability strongly depends on how collective the motion is.

Other specific applications 
There are several major areas in which the Gaussian network model and other elastic network models have proved to be useful. These include:

 Spring bead based network model: In spring-bead based network model, the springs and beads are used as components in the crosslinked network. Springs are cross-linked to represent mechanical behavior of the material and bridge molecular dynamics (MD) model and finite element (FE) model (see Figure. 5). The beads represent material mass of cluster bonds. Each spring is used to represent a cluster of polymer chains, instead of part of a single polymer chain. This simplification allows to bridge different models at multiple length scales and improves the simulation efficiency significantly. At each iteration step in the simulation, forces in the springs are applied to the nodes at the center of the beads, and the equilibrated nodal displacements throughout the system are calculated. Different from the traditional FE method for obtaining stress and strain, the spring–bead model provides the displacements of the nodes and forces in the springs. The equivalent strain and strain energy of spring–bead based network model can be defined and calculated using the displacements of nodes and the spring characteristics. Furthermore, the results from the network model can be scaled up to obtain the structural response at the macroscale using FE analysis.
 Decomposition of flexible/rigid regions and domains of proteins 
 Characterization of functional motions and functionally important sites/residues of proteins, enzymes and large macromolecular assemblies 
 Refinement and dynamics of low-resolution structural data, e.g. Cryo-electron microscopy
 Molecular replacement for solving X-ray structures, when a conformational change occurred, with respect to a known structure
 Integration with atomistic models and simulations 
 Investigation of folding/unfolding pathways and kinetics.
 Annotation of functional implication in molecular evolution

Web servers 
In practice, two kinds of calculations can be performed.
The first kind (the GNM per se) makes use of the Kirchhoff matrix. The second kind (more specifically called either the Elastic Network Model or the Anisotropic Network Model) makes use of the Hessian matrix associated to the corresponding set of harmonic springs. Both kinds of models can be used online, using the following servers.

GNM servers 
 iGNM: A database of protein functional motions based on GNM http://ignm.ccbb.pitt.edu 
 oGNM: Online calculation of structural dynamics using GNM https://web.archive.org/web/20070516042756/http://ignm.ccbb.pitt.edu/GNM_Online_Calculation.htm

ENM/ANM servers 
 Anisotropic Network Model web server http://www.ccbb.pitt.edu/anm 
 elNemo: Web-interface to The Elastic Network Model http://www.sciences.univ-nantes.fr/elnemo/
 AD-ENM: Analysis of Dynamics of an Elastic Network Model http://enm.lobos.nih.gov/
 WEBnm@: Web-server for Normal Mode Analysis of proteins http://apps.cbu.uib.no/webnma/home

Other relevant servers 
 ProDy: An Application Programming Interface (API) in Python, that integrates GNM and ANM analyses and several molecular structure and sequence analyses and visualization tools: http://prody.csb.pitt.edu 
 HingeProt: An algorithm for protein hinge prediction using elastic network models http://www.prc.boun.edu.tr/appserv/prc/hingeprot/, or http://bioinfo3d.cs.tau.ac.il/HingeProt/hingeprot.html
 DNABindProt: A Server for Determination of Potential DNA Binding Sites of Proteins http://www.prc.boun.edu.tr/appserv/prc/dnabindprot/
 MolMovDB: A database of macromolecular motions: http://www.molmovdb.org/

See also 
 Gaussian distribution
 Harmonic oscillator
 Hooke's law
 Molecular dynamics
 Normal mode
 Principal component analysis
 Protein dynamics
 Rubber elasticity
 Statistical mechanics

References

Primary sources 

 
 
 Cui Q, Bahar I, (2006). Normal Mode Analysis: Theory and applications to biological and chemical systems, Chapman & Hall/CRC, London, UK

Specific citations 

Molecular modelling